The 2013 season was the current Tampa Bay Rowdies fourth season of existence, and third playing in the North American Soccer League, the second tier of American soccer pyramid. Including the original Rowdies franchise and the Tampa Bay Mutiny, this was the 26th season of a professional soccer team fielded in the Tampa Bay region.

The Rowdies entered the 2013 season as the defending NASL Champions.

Background 

The 2012 season marked one of the most successful seasons in modern Rowdies history, as the club finished second in the league table during the regular season. During the regular season, Tampa Bay amassed 45 points in 28 matches, and tallied for 12 wins, nine draws and seven losses. By finishing in the upper two spots of the league table, Tampa Bay earned a bye to the semifinals of the 2012 NASL Playoffs, where they took on Carolina RailHawks in the two-leg semifinal series. Ultimately, the Rowdies defeated the RailHawks 5–4 on aggregate, earning themselves a berth into the Championship round. There, Tampa Bay took on the Minnesota Stars FC, and had the luxury of hosting the second leg, due to the better season record. Tampa Bay fell 2–0 in the first leg of the series, but were able to recover in the second leg of the series, winning the match 3–1 and tying the match on aggregate. The aggregate tie allowed the match to enter a penalty shoot-out, in which Tampa Bay emerged victorious, 3–2, over Minnesota.

Club

Roster

Team management 

  Perry Van der Beck – Executive Vice President, Technical Director, and Director of Player Development
  Lee Cohen – Director of Operations
  Ricky Hill – Head Coach
  Slobodan Janjuš – Goalkeeper Coach
  James Faylo – Head Athletic Trainer
  Patrick Horan – Team Physician

Competitions

Preseason

Friendlies

I-4 Derby

Orlando City won 6–4 on aggregate and won the I-4 Derby.

Walt Disney World Pro Soccer Classic 

 Group stage

NASL Spring season

Standings

Results summary

Results by round

Match reports

NASL Fall season

Standings

Results summary

Results by round

Match reports

U.S. Open Cup

Honors

Individual honors
NASL Golden Ball Award (MVP)
 Georgi Hristov

NASL Best XI
 Luke Mulholland, Georgi Hristov

Transfers

In

Out

Loan in

Loan out

References 

2013
Tampa Bay Rowdies
Tampa Bay Rowdies
Tampa Bay Rowdies
Sports in St. Petersburg, Florida